This is a list of recording artists who have reached number one on the album chart in Ireland since January 2003.

All acts are listed alphabetically.
Solo artists are alphabetized by last name (unless they use only their first name, e.g. Akon, listed under A), Groups by group name excluding "A," "An" and "The."

0-9

5 Seconds of Summer (2)
The 1975 (1)
50 Cent (2)

A

ABBA (2)
Andy Abraham (1)
AC/DC (3)
The Academic (2)
Adele (3)
Christina Aguilera (1)
Air (1)
Arcade Fire (5)
Arctic Monkeys (4)
Aslan (1)
Avenged Sevenfold (1)

B

Tom Baxter (1)
James Bay (1)
Bee Gees (1)
Bell X1 (3)
Beyoncé (5)
Biffy Clyro (1)
Justin Bieber (4)
Mary Black (1)
James Blunt (2)
Blur (1)
Bruno Mars (1)
Andrea Bocelli (1)
Matteo Bocelli (1)
 Virginia Bocelli (1)
Bon Jovi (1)
David Bowie (2)
Susan Boyle (1) 
Boyzone (1)
Niall Breslin (1)
Garth Brooks (1)
BTS (2)
Michael Bublé (4)
Jeff Buckley (1)
Mary Byrne (1)

C
Lewis Capaldi (1)
Nathan Carter (5)
Cascada (1)
Paddy Casey (1)
Johnny Cash (2)
Nick Cave and the Bad Seeds (1)
Christine and the Queens (1)
Gerry Cinnamon (1)
Kelly Clarkson (1)
 CMAT (1)
Leonard Cohen (1)
Coldplay (5)
J. Cole (1)
The Corrs (2)
The Coronas (3)
Miley Cyrus (2)

D

D12 (1)
Daft Punk (1)
Damien Dempsey (2)
Dave (1)
Cathy Davey (1)
Mike Denver (1)
Dido (1)
Celine Dion (1)
Dr. Dre (1)
Drake (3)
Duffy (1)
Bob Dylan (2)

E

Billie Eilish (2)
Elbow (2)
Eminem (7)

F

Faithless (1)
Fatboy Slim (1)
Shane Filan (1)
Mick Flannery (3)
Florence and the Machine (2)
Foo Fighters (2)
Fontaines D.C. (1)
The Frames (2)

G

Lady Gaga (4)
Liam Gallagher (2)
Glee Cast (4)
Ariana Grande (3)
David Gray (1)
Green Day (2)
The Gloaming (1)
Gorillaz (1)
Ellie Goulding (1)
Guns N' Roses (1)

H

Ham Sandwich (1)
Lisa Hannigan (2)
Mickey Joe Harte (1)
Christie Hennessy (1)
Niall Horan (2)
Whitney Houston (1)
Hozier (2)
Hudson Taylor (1)

I
Inhaler (2)
Interpol (1)

J

J. Cole (1)
Michael Jackson (2)
Jedward (3)
Gavin James (2)
JLS (1)
Billy Joel (1)
Jack Johnson (1)
Norah Jones (2)
Juice Wrld (1)

K

Keane (2)
Ronan Keating (1)
Dermot Kennedy (2)
Keywest (1)
The Killers (4)
Kings of Leon (6)
David Kitt (1)
Kodaline (3)
KSI (1)

L

Kendrick Lamar (1)
Avril Lavigne (3)
Leona Lewis (1)
Lil Nas X (1)
Linkin Park (2)
Dua Lipa (1)
Little Mix (3)
Little Green Cars (1)

M

Madonna (3)
Post Malone (2)
Marina and the Diamonds (1)
Maroon 5 (1)
Massive Attack (2)
Imelda May (4)
Meat Loaf (1)
Shawn Mendes (1)
Metallica (3)
George Michael (1)
Christy Moore (3)
James Morrison (1)
James Vincent McMorrow (1)
Mumford & Sons (3)
Mundy (1)
The Murder Capital (1)
George Murphy (1)
Muse (3)

N

The National (1)
Noel Gallagher's High Flying Birds (2)
Paolo Nutini (4))

O

Sinéad O'Connor (1)
Ryan O'Shaughnessy (1)
Oasis (1)
Of Monsters & Men (1)
One Direction (4)
 Original Motion Picture Cast (1)

P

Paramore (2)
Paul Potts (1)
Pearl Jam (1)
Katy Perry (2)
Picture This (3)
Pink (3)
Pink Floyd (1)
Robert Plant (1)
Planxty (1)
Pop Smoke (1)
The Priests (1)

Q

Queens of the Stone Age (1)
Eoghan Quigg (1)

R

R.E.M. (3)
Radiohead (4)
Rag'n'Bone Man (1)
Lana Del Rey (2)
Red Hot Chili Peppers (4)
Damien Rice (3)
Rihanna (3)
The Riptide Movement (1)
Olivia Rodrigo (1)
Rodrigo y Gabriela (1)
Mario Rosenstock (2)
Royal Blood (2)
Derek Ryan (2)

S

Sam Smith (3)
Emeli Sandé (1)
Sandi Thom (1)
Scissor Sisters (2)
The Script (7)
Shakira (1)
Sharon Shannon (1)
Ed Sheeran (5)
Ryan Sheridan (1)
Sigur Rós (1)
Slipknot (1)
Snow Patrol (5)
Britney Spears (3)
Bruce Springsteen (9)
Stereophonics (2)
Rod Stewart (1)
Stormzy (1)
The Streets (1)
Harry Styles (3)
The Strypes (1)
Taylor Swift (8)

T

Take That (3)
The Thrills (2)
Justin Timberlake (3)
Timbaland (1)
Traveling Wilburys (1)
Two Door Cinema Club (1)

U

U2 (4)
Usher (1)

V

Villagers (3)

W

Walking on Cars (1)
Shayne Ward (2)
The Weeknd (3)
Kanye West (2)
Westlife (7)
Robbie Williams (5)
Amy Winehouse (1)

X

 Charli XCX (1)
 The xx (1)

Y

Years & Years (1)
Yungblud (1)

Z

See also 
Irish Albums Chart

External links 
IRMA Official Site
Chart archive to 1964

Number one
Irish record chart
Artists who reached number one in Ireland
Entertainment-related lists of superlatives